There were two successions of Bishops of Dorchester in the medieval era:

for the 7th century bishops in Wessex, see Bishop of Winchester
for the 9th–11th century bishops in Mercia, see Bishop of Lincoln

Bishops in England